Steinar Lone (born 23 August 1955) is a Norwegian translator.

In 2009 he was awarded the Norwegian Critics Prize for Literature of 2008, for his translation of Mircea Cărtărescu's Orbitor. Aripa stângă.

References

1955 births
Living people
Norwegian translators